Trichosea nigricatena is a moth of the family Noctuidae. It is endemic to Ceram and Sulawesi.

Pantheinae
Moths described in 1922